Baylor County is a county located in the U.S. state of Texas.  As of the 2020 census, its population was 3,465. Its county seat is Seymour.

History
In 1858, the Texas Legislature established Baylor County, naming it for Henry Weidner Baylor, a surgeon in the Texas Rangers during the Mexican–American War. It organized in 1879.

Geography

Major highways
  U.S. Highway 82
  U.S. Highway 183
  U.S. Highway 277
  U.S. Highway 283
  State Highway 114

Adjacent counties

 Wilbarger County (north)
 Wichita County (northeast)
 Archer County (east)
 Young County (southeast)
 Throckmorton County (south)
 Haskell County (southwest)
 Knox County (west)
 Foard County (northwest)

Geology

Baylor County is part of the Texas Red Beds, which are strata of red-colored sedimentary rock from the Early Permian. The fossils of Permian period vertebrates in the Texas Red Beds were first discovered by Edward Drinker Cope in 1877. Subsequent research has revealed rare fossils of Permian amphibians like Trimerorhachis, as well as rich deposits of other Permian tetrapods such as Dimetrodon and Diadectes. Seymouria baylorensis, a species of Seymouria, was first discovered and named after Baylor County and the city of Seymour.

Demographics

Note: the US Census treats Hispanic/Latino as an ethnic category. This table excludes Latinos from the racial categories and assigns them to a separate category. Hispanics/Latinos can be of any race.

As of the census of 2000,  4,093 people, 1,791 households, and 1,156 families resided in the county.  The population density was five people per square mile (2/km2).  The 2,820 housing units averaged three per square mile (1/km2).  The racial makeup of the county was 90.96% White, 3.35% Black or African American, 0.59% Native American, 0.51% Asian, 0.12% Pacific Islander, 3.32% from other races] and 1.15% from two or more races;  9.33% were Hispanic or Latino of any race.

Of the 1,791 households,  25.2% had children under the age of 18 residing in them, 53.5% were married couples living together, 8.2% had a female householder with no husband present, and 35.4% were not families. In addition, 33.30% of all households were made up of individuals, and 19.2% had someone living alone who was 65 years of age or older.  The average household size was 2.26 and the average family size was 2.86.

In the county, the population was distributed as 23.4% under the age of 18, 5.5% from 18 to 24, 21.4% from 25 to 44, 25.6% from 45 to 64, and 24.1% who were 65 years of age or older.  The median age was 45 years. For every 100 females, there were 89.50 males.  For every 100 females age 18 and over, there were 86.70 males.

The median income for a household in the county was $24,627, and for a family was $34,583. Males had a median income of $21,607 versus $19,571 for females. The per capita income for the county was $16,384.  About 16.1% of the population and 12.9% of families were below the poverty line, and 26.3% of those under the age of 18 and 9% of those 65 and older were living below the poverty line.

Educational attainment
According to the 2000 census, 21.2% of those aged over 25 did not have a high school diploma, while 32.7% did. Roughly 8.7% of the population had a bachelor's degree, 2.3% had a master's degree, and 0.2% had a doctoral degree. No males had doctoral degrees, while 0.4% of females had one.

Education
Almost all of Baylor County is served by the Seymour Independent School District, which also serves portions of adjacent counties. A small portion is served by the Olney Independent School District. The OISD portion was served by the Megargel Independent School District, until MISD closed after May 2006.

The county is in the service area of Vernon College.

Communities

City
 Seymour (county seat)

Unincorporated communities
 Bomarton
 Mabelle
 Red Springs
 Round Timber
 Westover

Politics
Baylor County is represented in the Texas House of Representatives by Republican James Frank, a businessman from Wichita Falls.

See also

 Recorded Texas Historic Landmarks in Baylor County

References

External links

 
 Baylor County from the Texas Almanac
 Baylor County from the TXGenWeb Project
 Baylor County Profile from the Texas Association of Counties
 Baylor County Website

 
1879 establishments in Texas
Populated places established in 1879